The Cullman Historic District is a historic district in Cullman, Alabama.  The district covers 89 acres (36 ha) and has 77 contributing properties, which are predominantly residential buildings.  The town was founded in 1873 by German merchant John G. Cullmann on land along the Louisville and Nashville Railroad line between Huntsville and Birmingham.  The earliest residential development came in the form of log houses, many of which were replaced by stately Victorian and Queen Anne homes in the 1880s and 1890s.  In the early 20th century, many homes with Eastlake details were constructed.  Beginning in the 1920s, many bungalows were built.  After the 1930s, most houses built were more spartan, however some notable Jacobethan Revival are represented.  Other notable buildings in the district are the Works Progress Administration-built East Elementary School (1936) and the St. John's United Church of Christ (1924).

The district was listed on the National Register of Historic Places in 1984.

References

National Register of Historic Places in Cullman County, Alabama
Historic districts in Cullman County, Alabama
Historic districts on the National Register of Historic Places in Alabama